Edmondstown, also historically called 'Ballyhamon', is a townland and small outer suburb of Dublin, in the jurisdiction of South Dublin. It is on the R116 regional road, south of Ballyboden and north of Rockbrook, in the valley of the Owendoher River. Edmondstown National School is a Catholic primary school which serves the local area and has an attendance of 103 students. It won an Active Flag and the STEM plaque of excellence in science, technology, engineering and maths.

The area also holds Edmondstown Golf Course, on Edmondstown Road. The remains of 27 people were discovered in the 1950s at the golf course when work uncovered an Early Bronze Age cemetery.

References

Towns and villages in South Dublin (county)